Robert Lawson is an American playwright, director, composer, screenwriter and visual artist. His film, What Goes Up, co-written with Jonathan Glatzer and starring Steve Coogan, Olivia Thirlby, Hilary Duff, Molly Shannon and Josh Peck, was released on May 29, 2009. The film was distributed by Sony Pictures, with a DVD release on June 16, 2009 by Sony Home Entertainment.

Lawson is the author and composer of dozens of theater works, a number of which are published by Playscripts, Inc. and are regularly produced across the U.S., Europe and Asia. Among these are Hiroshima : crucible of light which has been produced in Singapore, London, Vancouver and Australia. NYC premiere was in 2009 by the Untitled Theater Co. 61 at Walkerspace. Texts have also appeared in American Writing, Poems & Plays and The Northern New England Review.  He is the recipient of a Meet the Composer grant for his work on Leonardo’s Tank produced by Andy’s Summer Playhouse (NH) for which he was artistic director 1995-2007.

Works in process include: 
 Laws of Nature — feature screenplay based on Lawson's short story collection Geometric Cemetery in development with 1stAvenue Machine (NYC, LA, London), Andrew Geller - producer, starring Sam Huntington (slated for 2019/2020 production).
Dream/State — development and pilot scripting for a television series based on Brian Keaney's trilogy. Goodman Pictures, Aaron Wiederspahn, Joe Goodman and Wojciech Frykowski, producers. (2018 option)
 The Ruins of Nicholas Raithe — currently developing a television series from an original story by Lawson. In process, with Sam Huntington.
 The Great God Sokolov — slated to direct feature film adaptation he has written with Karen Sunde of her play "To Moscow". Ashworth Productions (Canadian co-production - 2020).
Previous work includes:
 Co-author (with Jonathan Glatzer) of Tyler’s Gap, a television project produced by Touchstone/ABC & Fox Television - Rob Bowman, director; David Duchovney, Executive Producer. 
 Play commission (by co-author Marlin Fitzwater) entitled Empires Fall concerning the fall of Communism and the relationship between George H. W. Bush & Mikhail Gorbachev (staged reading at Ford’s Theater, D.C. 2011; subsequently at the Bush Presidential Library at Texas A&M Univ., 2013). 
His series of interrelated short fiction pieces under the title Geometric Cemetery is available at Amazon.com and at the Toadstool Bookshops (NH). Geometric Cemetery was a finalist in the Gorsky Press, Molly Ivors Prize for Fiction (2016). Apparitions - a collection of ghost stories - is slated to be published in 2018.

Directing premieres include: 
Quantum Janis a new musical by Richard Isen, staged reading at Ko Festival (Amherst, MA 2018), staged reading York Theater (NYC Dec. 2018)
The Death of Don Juan (an opera by Elodie Lauten) at Franklin Pierce University, and in 2011 conceiving & co-directing the New York premiere at Theater for the New City, as well as a screening of the video rendition of his production at the ‘Op on Screen Festival’ (NYC).
 Other notable works premiered at Franklin Pierce University (where he is on faculty through 2018) include script, score, direction & set design for : 
 Hamlet: 7 rooms (2014), a radical deconstruction created in collaboration with his wife, choreographer & visual artist Sally Bomer
 Vanishing Point (2013), utilizing a score of electronic dance music
 Echo Chamber (2011), concerning the massacre at Utøya Island in Norway
 Terrible Destiny (2010), inspired by Truman Capote’s ‘In Cold Blood’
 The Architect of NoPlace (2009), a music/theater project about silent films (in conjunction with Austrian writer & artist Kay Mühlmann)
 The Transit of Mercury Across the Face of the Sun (2009/2010), also in collaboration with S. Bomer, which was restaged at the Region 1 American College Theater Festival, and runner up for the National KC/ACTF Festival  
 …but the rain is full of ghosts was presented at the Kennedy Center as part of the National ACTF Festival (2003)
His series of multi-media installations - The Chapels Project - started in 2002 with an art/science endeavor based on the Camera Obscura that ran for two years (NH), and was followed up in 2004 with Recently Discovered : use unknown, a Wunderkammer environment of  real and imagined artifacts (also in NH).  In 2014, the third chapel, Memorial (ghost/embers) was installed at Franklin Pierce University, then subsequently at the Fitchburg Art Museum (MA, 2015) and then again in Keene, NH at the Thorne-Sagendorph Gallery.  A fourth chapel - Our Lady of the Sorrows - is in process. In the summer of 2017, his Devotional Book for the Church of Entomology was on exhibit at the Fitchburg Art Museum.

The Chronicle of Higher Education published a profile on him and his work in 2010, as did the Austrian periodical Freigeist - a publication of the Donau Universität in Krems, Austria, where he conducted an ongoing series of workshops in Narrative Strategies, Framing & Abstraction using digital media for the School of Telecommunications, Information and Media. He is on faculty at the New Hampshire Institute of the Arts MFA program in Writing for Stage & Screen.

INTERNATIONAL

Since 2010, Lawson has created new multi-media performance works as part of his Site Project initiative including The Interpretation of Dreams staged in Athens, Greece; Everyone Knows Who Bombed the Bank staged at the Hellenic American Union (Athens); and Artifacts, a staged at Monash University and the abandoned Calamai Textile Mill (Prato, Italy).

He is married to artist Sally Bomer. His two sons August and Finley live in Brooklyn, NY.

References

Living people
Year of birth missing (living people)